The Ripper at the Heaven's Gates of Dark is an album by Acid Mothers Temple & the Melting Paraiso U.F.O. released by Riot Season in October 2011. The album is available on CD or as a limited edition double-LP (500 copies), with artwork by Shigeno Sachiko.

Track listing

Personnel
 Tsuyama Atsushi - monster bass, voice, soprano sax, cimpo flute, soprano recorder, acoustic guitar, cosmic joker
 Higashi Hiroshi - synthesizer, dancin'king
 Shimura Koji - drums, latino cool
 Kawabata Makoto - electric guitar, electric bouzouki, sitar, organ, percussion, electronics, speed guru

Technical personnel
 Kawabata Makoto - Production and engineering, photography
 Yoshida Tatsuya - Digital mastering
 Justin "God" Waters - Members photo
 Shigeno Sachiko - Art work

References

Acid Mothers Temple albums
2011 albums